Bredbury railway station serves the town of Bredbury in the Metropolitan Borough of Stockport, Greater Manchester, England.

It was built by the  Sheffield and Midland Railway Companies' Committee in 1875, on the line between New Mills Central and Manchester London Road (since renamed Piccadilly).

The  station was modernised in 1976; the buildings on the eastbound side were replaced and the platforms were raised, with the result that the old waiting room on the Manchester side is three steps lower down. The original stationmaster's house survives, as does the 1916 footbridge.

Facilities
The ticket office on the eastbound side is staffed through the day on weekdays (06:20-20:50) and on Saturdays until early afternoon (07:20-14:20).  Outside these times, ticket must be bought on the train or prior to travel.  Waiting shelters are present on each platform and train running details are offered via automated announcements, digital information screens and timetable posters.  No step-free access is available (the ramp from the car park to the ticket hall has steps, as does the footbridge).

Service

Monday to Saturday daytimes see two trains per hour head northbound to Manchester Piccadilly and two southbound towards New Mills Central with hourly extensions to Sheffield.

Evenings see a twice hourly service in each direction.  On Sundays, there is an hourly service in each direction with a few  additional trains in summer between Manchester Piccadilly and Sheffield.

References

External links

Railway stations in the Metropolitan Borough of Stockport
DfT Category E stations
Former Great Central and Midland Joint Railway stations
Railway stations in Great Britain opened in 1875
Northern franchise railway stations